Indian Grove is an unincorporated community in the South Westfield Township of northeastern Surry County, North Carolina, United States.

Prominent landmarks in the community include Indian Grove Baptist Church.

External links
 History of Indian Graves (Grove) Settlement

Unincorporated communities in Surry County, North Carolina
Unincorporated communities in North Carolina